Kate Hawley is a New Zealand set and costume designer who works on film and stage productions. In film she designed the costumes for Crimson Peak (2015) and Mortal Engines (2018). Stage productions include work for the Royal New Zealand Ballet, the New Zealand Festival and the New Zealand Opera Company.

Biography 
Hawley grew up in Wellington, New Zealand, and attended Samuel Marsden Collegiate School from 1982 to 1988. Following high school, she studied graphic design at the Wellington School of Design at Wellington Polytechnic, completing a diploma in visual communication design in 1992. In 1996, she attended the Motley Theatre Design Course in London.

Hawley began her career in theatre and opera productions, and later moved into costume design for film. In 1993 Hawley won Costume Designer of the Year at the Chapman Tripp Theatre Awards. She has taught at Toi Whakaari The New Zealand Drama School.

Some stage productions she has worked on include as the set and costume designer of The Blonde, the Brunette and the Vengeful Redhead starring Kerry Fox, directed by Colin McColl in 2006 for Auckland Theatre Company. Costume design for opera The Trial of the Cannibal Dog (composer Matthew Suttor, librettist John Downie, director Christian Penny, conductor Peter Scholes, producer New Zealand Festival), and set and costume design of Hansel and Gretel, a Royal New Zealand Ballet production choreographed by Loughlan Prior. In 2007 Hawley was the production designer of the New Zealand Opera production of Lucia di Lammermoor. In reviewing this production, Pepe Becker wrote:The all-female leaders of the creative team (director Lindy Hume, assistant director Sara Brodie and production designer Kate Hawley) are to be congratulated for their outstanding and ingenious direction. Venturing away from the traditional sort of production one expects for a Donizetti work proves to be a good move.In film Hawley has worked for Peter Jackson on The Lovely Bones and with Guillermero Del Toro on The Hobbit, Pacific Rim and Crimson Peak. She designed the costumes for Edge of Tomorrow (2014), the 2016 movie Suicide Squad, and Mortal Engines directed by Christian Rivers.

In 2016, Hawley was nominated for a Saturn Award for Best Costume Design for her work on Crimson Peak.

References 

Living people
People from Wellington City
New Zealand costume designers
Women costume designers
People educated at Samuel Marsden Collegiate School
Year of birth missing (living people)
New Zealand theatre people
New Zealand scenic designers
New Zealand film people
Set designers